Mario Alcalde (September 6, 1926 – April 22, 1971) was an American film and television actor.

Alcalde was born in Key West, Florida, the son of Armando Alcalde. Alcalde attended the American Theatre Wing. He began his screen career in 1954, appearing in the television drama series Robert Montgomery Presents. Alcalde then made an appearance in the 1956 film Crowded Paradise, which starred Hume Cronyn and Nancy Kelly. He played as Juan Figueroa. In the early 1950s he had also acted on stage, appearing in an Off-Broadway production of the play Bullfight.

Alcalde later guest-starred in television programs including Gunsmoke, Bonanza, Daniel Boone, Voyage to the Bottom of the Sea, 77 Sunset Strip, Dr. Kildare, The Man from U.N.C.L.E., Man with a Camera, The Virginian and The Wild Wild West. He played the recurring role of Yellow Hawk in the western television series The Texan. Alcalde also played therapist Chuck Atwell in the television soap opera Peyton Place.

Alcalde appeared in films including All the Young Men (1960), Dead Ringer (1964), and Hail, Hero! (1969). His final credit was from the 1971 film Clay Pigeon. He had two screenwriting credits, for the medical drama television series The Nurses and the crime drama television series The Fugitive.

Alcalde died in April 1971 in Glendale, California, at the age of 44.

References

External links 

Rotten Tomatoes profile

1926 births
1971 deaths
People from Key West, Florida
Male actors from Florida
American male film actors
American male stage actors
American male television actors
American male soap opera actors
20th-century American male actors
Western (genre) television actors
American male screenwriters
American television writers
American male television writers
20th-century American screenwriters